Madhya Pradesh State Highway 39 (MP SH 39) is a State Highway running from Sendhwa town in Barwani district lying near NH-52 till Thandla town.

It passes through Barwani, Kukshi, Bagh, Jobat and Jhabua.

See also
 List of state highways in Madhya Pradesh
 Madhya Pradesh Road Development Corporation Limited

References

State Highways in Madhya Pradesh